Martin Hernández (born 1 June 1964) is a Mexican sound editor and designer. He was nominated for two Academy Awards for his work on the films Birdman (2014) and The Revenant (2015), the latter of which also earned him a British Academy Film Award.

Awards and nominations
Major awards

Academy Awards

British Academy Film Awards

Ariel Awards

Golden Reel Awards

Goya Awards

Satellite Awards

References

External links 
 

1964 births
Living people
Ariel Award winners
Best Sound BAFTA Award winners
Goya Award winners
People from Mexico City
Sound editors
Sound designers